Black Winter Day is an EP / single / split album by Finnish metal band Amorphis with Dutch metal band Gorefest, released in 1995. The track "Black Winter Day" is one of the band's best-known songs and continues to be a crowd favourite in live performances to this very day.

The song is covered by Children of Bodom on their album I Worship Chaos.

The song is also covered by Dol Ammad and the track appears on their album Winds of the Sun.

This is the last Amorphis release with Kasper Mårtenson and to have the band's original logo.

Track listing

Personnel

Amorphis 
Amorphis – arrangements, recording and engineering
Tomi Koivusaari – vocals and rhythm guitar
Esa Holopainen – lead guitar
Olli-Pekka Laine – bass guitar
Kasper Martenson – keyboards
Jan Rechberger – drums

Additional personnel 
Ville Tuomi – speech/spoken word
Tomas Skogsberg – recording & engineering

Gorefest 
Jan-Chris de Koeijer – vocals and bass
Boudewijn Bonebakker – guitars
Frank Harthoorn – guitars
Ed Warby – drums

References 

1995 EPs
Amorphis albums
Albums with cover art by Wes Benscoter
Relapse Records EPs